"To See My Angel Cry" is a song co-written and recorded by American country music artist Conway Twitty.

Recording and Release
Twitty recorded the song at Bradley's Barn studio Mt. Juliet, Tennessee, on June 24, 1969, the same day he cut "That's When She Started to Stop Loving You". It was released in August 1969 as the first single and title track from the album To See My Angel Cry.  The song was Twitty's third number one on the country charts.  The single spent a single week at number one and a total of 13 weeks on the country chart.  It was written by Twitty, L. E. White and Carlton Haney.

Personnel
Conway Twitty — vocals
Joe E. Lewis, The Jordanaires — background vocals
Harold Bradley — electric 6-string bass guitar
Grady Martin — electric guitar
Larry Butler — piano
Ray Edenton — acoustic guitar
John Hughey — steel guitar
Tommy Markham — drums and percussion
Bob Moore — bass
Herman Wade — electric guitar

Chart performance

References

1969 singles
1969 songs
Conway Twitty songs
Songs written by Conway Twitty
Songs written by L. E. White
Song recordings produced by Owen Bradley
Decca Records singles